Duy-Loan T. Le (born 1962, Vietnam) is an engineer and the first woman and Asian elected as a Texas Instruments Senior Fellow.

Early life
Born in Nha Trang, South Vietnam, in 1962 to a labor-class family, Duy-Loan Le fled to the U.S. without her father and a family of nine in 1975, eventually settling in Houston. Her family joined her in the U.S. few years later.

Although Le knew no English when she arrived, she mastered the language fast enough to graduate from Alief Hastings High School at 16 as Valedictorian of her class of 335 students.

In 1976, she received her first recognition in the US as 'Citizen of the Month' from Kiwanis International Club.

In 1981, The Houston Chronicle featured her as 'Scholastic Wonder'; she also received commendation from The Office of The Ambassador of The Royal Netherlands for her scholastic achievement and her humanitarian effort in fund raising to aid the Vietnamese refugees.

University work and career 
In 1982, at the age of 19, Duy-Loan  received her undergraduate BSEE degree, magna cum laude, from the University of Texas at Austin and subsequently obtained her MBA in May 1989 from the University of Houston while working full-time. She began her career at Texas Instruments as a memory design engineer.

Duy-Loan's technical contributions at Texas Instruments were recognized when she was elected a Member of Technical Staff in 1990, Senior Member of Technical Staff in 1993, the first woman at TI to be elected Distinguished Member of Technical Staff in 1997, and the first woman elected TI-Fellow in 1999.

Currently she manages development projects for wireless communications as TI program manager for Laplace (a Digital signal processor (DSP) chip for 3G base stations) and also serves as manager of DSP Advanced Ramp. In 2002, Duy-Loan became the first Asian-American, and the first woman, to be elected TI Senior Fellow in Texas Instruments' 75-year history.  She joins four men who hold this title at TI worldwide. Today she remains the only woman with this title.

Philanthropy
Duy-Loan participates in numerous charity and fund raising projects for colleges, orphanages, and charity foundations. She serves on the Board of two non-profit organizations which promote education and support social economic development projects in the third world.

Duy-Loan has worked to advance education and learning conditions in Vietnam. She believes that by doing so, the environment for learning will produce more students who will be able to improve the overall state of Vietnam. She recently achieved her longtime dream of bringing soundly-built school facilities to rural Vietnam with the opening of “Thanh Thoi B”—a schoolhouse accommodating 120 elementary-age students and whose construction she played a leadership role in implementing. Her dream is to raise enough money to build 100 schools in five years. This activity complements well her similar effort in 10 other countries.

Ms. Le speaks annually at numerous national events to help create an environment that stimulates and releases leadership potential in women and Asian Americans.

Duy-Loan's service to the community includes:
 United Way, Vietnamese Culture & Science Association's sponsored projects, and taught Junior Achievement for many years.
 Director of Mona Foundation, promoting education and supporting social economic development in 10 countries including Nur University and Barli Vocational Institute for Rural Women in Indore
 Founding member and Advisory Board Director for Sunflower mission bringing educational assistance to Vietnam.
 Founding member and Honorary Board Director for Science National Honor Society, promoting math and science at high schools.
 ECE Visiting committee for The University of Texas College of Engineering.
 Serving on University of Texas (UT) Commission 125, shaping UT's educational future for the next 25 years.
 An invited speaker nationwide (including universities, IEEE, and Women in Technology International (WITI))

Personal life
Duy-Loan Le is married to Tuan N. Dao. They have two sons, Dan Dao and Don Dao. She also holds a black belt in Taekwon-Do and has won several medals and trophies in the State of Texas. For fun, Duy-Loan enjoys deep-sea fishing, playing poker, and reading. She listens to classical music and also traditional Vietnamese music.

Achievements and awards
Leader of the development of TI's Digital Signal Process products, including one recognized in the 2004 Guinness World Records as the fastest single-core DSP in the world.
Accumulated 24 patents, all earning places in Texas Instruments' Hall of Fame.
Top 20 Houston Women in Technology in 2000
Women in Technology Hall of Fame in 2001
National Technologist of the Year at the Women of Color Conference held in Atlanta in September, 2002.
Director of Board of National Instruments
Outstanding Young Graduate Award from University of Texas-College of Engineering
Outstanding Young Texas Exe Award from The University of Texas-Texas Exes
Asian American Engineer of the year
2007 Anita Borg Institute Women of Vision Award for Leadership
Congressional Special Recognition
In 2007, she made an appearance and was interviewed for her outstanding achievements on Paris By Night DVD 90 - "Chan Dung Nguoi Phu Nu Viet Nam," a musical show celebrating Vietnamese women around the world.
2017 Asian Hall of Fame

References

External links
Sunflower Mission's Official Website
Brief biography of Duy-Loan Le - Science National Honor Society
Asian American Forum 2003 Leadership Institute, Duy-Loan Le as one of the Featured Speakers
Quick facts on Duy-Loan Le - University of Texas at Austin, Thursday, July 31, 2003
Vang 2006 Honorees (archived 2006)
 Duy-Loan Le: Bold Visions Women in Science and Technology", TV documentary
 "Interview with Duy-Loan Le", Blacktie Arizona

1962 births
Living people
Cockrell School of Engineering alumni
Le, Duy Loan
Le, Duy Loan
Texas Instruments people
University of Houston alumni
American humanitarians
Women humanitarians
Vietnamese emigrants to the United States
21st-century American women